The loss of a pet or an animal to which one has become emotionally bonded oftentimes results in grief which can be comparable with the death of a human loved one, or even greater, depending on the individual. The death can be felt more intensely when the owner has made a decision to end the pet's life through euthanasia. While there is strong evidence that animals can feel such loss for other animals, this article focuses on human feelings, when an animal is lost, dies or otherwise is departed.

Effect of animal loss on humans
There is no set amount of time for the grieving process to occur. However, mourning is much more intense for a pet upon whom the owner was emotionally dependent. Additionally, some pet owners may feel unable to express their grieving due to social customs and norms surrounding pets. If the pet owner internalizes the grief, the suffering increases.

The stages of grief proposed by Elizabeth Kübler-Ross were designed in relation to human death, but can be adapted to describe the grief process for the death of a pet. Indeed, pet death includes several lessons: 1) the relationship rather than the object (the animal) is central to understand the loss; 2) the manner of death/loss will affect the grieving process; 3) the age and living situation of the bereaved will affect the grieving process.

University of Michigan did a study of grief involving 174 adults who had deceased pets. Participants were administered a modified CENSHARE Pet Attachment Survey. Results indicate that initially 85.7% of owners experienced at least one symptom of grief, but the occurrence decreased to 35.1% at six months and to 22.4% at one year. Males and females reported different rates on six of 12 symptoms surveyed. The severity and length of symptoms was significantly correlated with the degree of attachment to the deceased pet. These findings indicate that pet loss can be a potential area of clinical concern, especially if the person's attachment to the pet was strong.

Coping with death
Though well-meaning phrases like "time heals all wounds" can simply upset the grieving pet owner, it is true that the one factor required for all coping strategies is time. Coping also involves understanding the emotions surrounding the loss of a pet, and then accepting the emotions to focus towards positive solutions.

Coping strategies may include:
 Going through the grieving process
 Strengthening positive memories
 Seeking support from resources, organizations and individuals
 Seeking solace from one's own spiritual beliefs
 Preparing for a pet's death in advance
Pet owners may also seek to memorialize their pets, for example by placing their remains in a cremation urn or jewelry. Other traditions include erecting stone memorials or other commemorative plaques for deceased pets, or by nicknaming objects like stars after them. Additionally, a 2020 report found that 19% of Americans wanted to be buried with the remains of their pet after they themselves had passed.

Types of loss
There are several special types of loss:
 Pet is missing (considered an unresolved loss)
 Pet is lost through divorce/separation
 Pet is accidentally injured or killed
 Pet is willfully injured or killed
 Pet is stolen
 Pet dies naturally
 Pet is euthanized
 Pet becomes very ill

Getting a new animal
Before bringing a new pet into the home following the death of a previous pet, some advise people to carefully consider the timing. Additionally, it is recommended to consider where the bereaved is in the grieving process, and to choose the new pet for its own unique qualities rather than trying to replace the former pet.

Workplace issues
Pet illness and death is gradually becoming recognized as similar to other forms of sickness and death in the family. In the UK, a variety of companies provide paid leave for such eventualities, with employment tribunals backing this in some instances where employment terms did not specifically mention pet loss.

Recent studies by insurers suggest that up to one in four pet owners are sufficiently affected by pet loss or illness to take time off, but that many feel this will be treated lightly and hence simply state they were sick. According to Petplan, 35% of people admitted to taking time off work to either settle new pets into the home or care for sick pets, and half of those admitted taking a whole week off, and according to Direct Line one in four pet owners "said they have been too upset to go into the workplace when their four legged friend died" and "many of those who did go into work after the death of their pet said they were unproductive." The latter survey also noted that pet owners in the UK take "around 8 days off" due to grief at the death of a pet, and that "seventy-nine percent of people responding to the survey admitted they did not think their boss would be sympathetic, and the only way they could get time off work was by... pretending to be ill."

Pet loss resources
Resources for pet loss change regularly, but include grief counseling, support groups, online forums, hotlines and books.  The Pet Loss Support Page maintains an updated list of recommended resources.

Resources include:
 Hotlines: Several veterinary schools around the United States have pet loss support hotlines, as well as various nonprofit agencies.
 Online forums: Internet search engines using "pet loss support" as a search term will locate several online forums available for grieving pet owners. Also, there are digital memorial websites for pets. The online community allows you to create a profile, compiling images, details, and memories of your pet in one place.
 Books: Books on pet loss are published regularly
 Grief Counseling: Therapists with training in grief therapy can be located in local communities. In addition, therapists may also include support groups that meet regularly to discuss issues surrounding pet loss. 
Hospices: Some hospices offer grief support 
 Websites - Organizations may have webpages with various resources for grieving pet owners

Beliefs about non-human death

Some world religions have held that beloved pets will join their families in an afterlife. Animal worship was common in the ancient world, influencing the burial practices of animals. Animal mummification was practiced in ancient Egypt, and  gave special significance to cats in some areas. Egyptians believed that mummification was imperative in order to gain admittance to the afterlife, ensuring the animals’ immortality.

Some ancient Egyptian families believed that mummified pets would keep the deceased company in the afterlife. The most common Egyptian pets included cats, dogs, mongooses, monkeys, gazelles, and birds. Many Egyptians loved their pets and, according to the Greek observer Herodotus, the customary process of mourning the loss of a loved pet included crying and shaving one's eyebrows. Ancient Egyptian pets were given names like we name our pets today, evidenced by over 70 names deciphered in inscriptions identifying pet dog mummy remains.

Modern religions are divided as to whether or not non-human animals are believed to have souls, the ability to reincarnate, and whether animals will exist in the afterlife.

In the absence of a common religious belief, many pet owners have embraced the concept of the Rainbow Bridge.  The concept, the origin of which is not clearly known, speaks of a metaphorical or mythical place of reunion where pets that die live in a paradisical version of limbo, rejuvenated and free of pain and suffering, until their companion humans arrive upon their deaths. At this point, the pet(s) run to their companion humans, and they enter heaven together, never to be parted again.

In Mormonism, all organisms (as well as the entire planet Earth) are believed to have a spirit, but that beings without the gift of free agency (the ability to know and choose between right and wrong) are innocent and unblemished spirits who go straight to Heaven when they die. According to Mormon beliefs, animals will be resurrected along with humans at the end of days.

Animal chaplains are becoming increasingly popular for helping the bereaved family members deal with the loss of their pet to provide memorial services, spiritual reassurance, and grief counseling.

See also
 Death and culture
 Pet cemetery
 Pet psychic

References

External links
 Healing Pet Loss
 Pet ownership and human health: a brief review of evidence and issues
 End-of-Life Care FAQ
 Pet Loss Grief Counseling Resources by State
Different ways people deal with Pet Loss

Animal death
Animals and humans
Pets